The SS Sapulpa Victory was the 14th Victory ship built for the United States during World War II under the Emergency Shipbuilding program. The vessel was launched by the California Shipbuilding Company on April 29, 1944, and completed on June 19, 1944. The ship's US Maritime Commission designation was VC2-S-AP3, hull number 14 (V-14). The Sapulpa served in the Pacific Theater during World War II and was operated by the Alcoa SS Company.

The 10,500-ton Victory ships were designed to replace the earlier Liberty ships. While Liberty ships were designed to be used only during World War II, Victory ships were designed to last longer and serve the US Navy both during and after the war. Victory ships differed from Liberty ships in that they were faster, longer, wider, taller, had a thinner stack set further toward the superstructure and had a long raised forecastle.

SS Sapulpa Victory was christened and launched at the yards of the California Shipbuilding Corporation on Terminal Island in Los Angeles. It was one of the 218 Victory ships that were named after American cities.

World War II
In World War II, the SS Sapulpa Victory served in the Pacific War.  On January 21, 1945, she steamed into Ulithi atoll, a repair and re-supply base used by the US Pacific Fleet. The ship was delivering supplies for the 6th Special Naval Construction Battalion, also known as the Seabees. The 6th Special Seabees were a combat stevedore battalion, trained to load and unload ships in safe harbors and under hostile fire during amphibious assaults. Seabees moved cargo including fuel, ammunition, bombs, rations, vehicles, and building materials. As a result of their role as supply vessels, the SS Sapulpa Victory and other cargo ships were targets for Japanese bombers, artillery, and Kamikaze attack planes.

Interbellum
On February 12, 1946, the Sapulpa Victory came to the assistance of the SS Augustus S. Merrimon, a Liberty ship in distress.

On July 9, 1946, 15,000 people watched a Finnish team win a game against the crew of the SS Sapulpa Victory while she was anchored outside Helsinki, Finland. The crew of the Beatrice Victory played on May 1, 1949, and won.
In 1948, the Sapulpa delivered goods as part of a post-war relief effort (see Marshall Plan), and delivered supplies to the US fleet.

Korean War
Sapulpa Victory served as a merchant marine naval ship, ferrying supplies for the Korean War. It made nine trips to Korea between February 2, 1951, and June 25, 1953. The ship helped to move the 140th Medium Tank Battalion. About 75% of the personnel and 90% of the cargo taken to Korea for the Korean War were brought by merchant marine ships. The SS Sapulpa Victory transported goods, mail, food, and other supplies.

Private use
In 1963, the SS Sapulpa Victory was sold to the Halcyon Steamship Company of New York City and renamed SS Halcyon Panther. In 1972, she was scrapped in Taiwan.

References

Sources
Sawyer, L. A. and W. H. Mitchell. Victory ships and tankers: The history of the 'Victory' type cargo ships and of the tankers built in the United States of America during World War II, Cornell Maritime Press, 1974, 0-87033-182-5.
United States Maritime Commission: 
Victory Cargo Ships 

Victory ships
Ships built in Los Angeles
United States Merchant Marine
1944 ships
World War II merchant ships of the United States